The Union Daily is a newspaper published in Burma. Due to law changes, the paper began freely publishing from 1 April 2013.  The Union Daily is backed by the Union Solidarity and Development political party, but promises not to be a "mouthpiece" for the party.

References

Daily newspapers published in Myanmar
Newspapers established in 2013
Burmese-language newspapers